Glyphipterix dichalina is a moth in the  family Glyphipterigidae. It is known from the Seychelles.

References

Glyphipterigidae
Fauna of Seychelles
Moths described in 1911
Moths of Africa